Roberto Colliard (born 8 January 1953) is a Mexican sailor. He competed in the Finn event at the 1972 Summer Olympics.

References

External links
 

1953 births
Living people
Mexican male sailors (sport)
Olympic sailors of Mexico
Sailors at the 1972 Summer Olympics – Finn
Place of birth missing (living people)